Chaetostomella is a genus of fruit flies in the family Tephritidae.

Species
Craspedoxantha bafut Freidberg & Mathis, 1990
Craspedoxantha indica Zaka-ur-Rab, 1960
Craspedoxantha manengubae Speiser, 1915
Craspedoxantha marginalis (Wiedemann, 1818)
Craspedoxantha milleri Freidberg, 1985
Craspedoxantha octopunctata Bezzi, 1913
Craspedoxantha polyspila Bezzi, 1924
Craspedoxantha unimaculata Bezzi, 1924
Craspedoxantha vernoniae Freidberg, 1985
Craspedoxantha veroniae Freidberg, 1985
Craspedoxantha yarivi Freidberg, 1999
Craspedoxantha yaromi Freidberg, 1985

References

Tephritinae
Tephritidae genera
Diptera of Africa
Diptera of Asia